Nicholas of Modruš (c. 1427 – 1480), born in Boka Kotorska, was a bishop of Modruš in Lika, the Pope's representative at the courts of King Stephen Tomašević of Bosnia and King Matthias Corvinus of Hungary (1463–1464). His huge library was left to the newly founded Vatican library (founded by Pope Sixtus IV). In 1478/79, he wrote a treatise in defence of the Glagolitic alphabet which he sent from Rome to the Modruš bishopric. It is regarded to be the first polemic treatise in the history of Croatian literature, and it was written in the Glagolitic Script. Buried in the church of Santa Maria del Popolo in Rome.

Works
 Dialogus de mortalium felicitate (1464)
 De titulis et auctoribus Psalmorum (1465)
 De consolatione (1466)
 De bellis Gothorum (1474)
 De humilitate
 Defensio ecclesiasticae libertatis (1479)

Sources
 Nikola Modruški 

1420s births
1480 deaths
15th-century Roman Catholic bishops in Croatia
Croats of Montenegro